Dom Hardman (born 24 August 1997 in England) is an English rugby union player who plays for the  in Global Rapid Rugby and the Super Rugby AU competition. His original playing position is prop. He was named in the Force squad for the Global Rapid Rugby competition in 2020.

References

External links
Rugby.com.au profile
itsrugby.co.uk profile

1997 births
Living people
English rugby union players
Rugby union players from Leeds
Rugby union props
Rugby union hookers
Western Force players
Waikato rugby union players